Jesse Peter Fowler (October 30, 1898 – September 23, 1973), nicknamed "Pete", was a Major League Baseball pitcher who played for the St. Louis Cardinals in 1924.  The 25-year-old rookie left-hander was a native of Spartanburg, South Carolina.

Fowler made his major league debut in relief on July 29, 1924, against the New York Giants at the Polo Grounds.  His first and only big league win, also in relief, was against the Philadelphia Phillies at Sportsman's Park.  The score was 13–10 in game 2 of a doubleheader played August 20, 1924.

Season and career totals include a record of 1–1 in 13 games pitched, 3 games started, 0 complete games, and 6 games finished.  In 32.2 innings pitched he struck out 5, walked 18, allowed 28 hits, and had an earned run average of 4.41.

Fowler died at the age of 74 in Columbia, South Carolina.

Despite an age difference of more than 23 years, Jesse was the older brother of former major league pitcher and pitching coach Art Fowler, and the Fowlers hold the record for the largest age difference between brothers who played Major League baseball.

External links
Baseball Reference
Retrosheet

St. Louis Cardinals players
Major League Baseball pitchers
Baseball players from South Carolina
1898 births
1973 deaths